The 1998 Islington Council election took place on 7 May 1998 to elect members of Islington London Borough Council in London, England. The whole council was up for election and the Labour Party lost overall control of the council to no overall control.

Election result
The results saw the Labour and Liberal Democrat parties finish tied on 26 seats each, after the Liberal Democrats gained 12 seats. The Liberal Democrat gains included taking the ward of Barnsbury, where the then Prime Minister Tony Blair had lived before becoming Prime Minister. In the final seat Labour won by 3 votes after 5 recounts to prevent the Liberal Democrats from winning a majority. This meant Labour was able to continue as the administration, relying on the casting vote of the Labour mayor Pat Haynes.

Reasons for the losses for Labour were reported as being the council tax level, which was the highest in London, poor schools and the council's £800 million debt.

At the same as the election Islington voted 81.55% in favour of the 1998 Greater London Authority referendum and 18.45% against, on a 34.15% turnout.

Ward results
* - Existing Councillor seeking re-election.

—

References

1998 London Borough council elections
1998